The Boston Police Department (BPD), dating back to 1838, holds the primary responsibility for law enforcement and investigation within the city of Boston, Massachusetts. It is the oldest municipal police department in the United States. The BPD is also the 20th largest law enforcement agency in the country.

History

Pre-incorporation (1635–1828) 
Before the existence of a formal police department, the first night watch was established in Boston in 1635. In 1703, pay in the sum of 35 shillings a month was set for members of the night watch. In 1796, the watch was reorganized, and the watchmen carried a badge of office, a rattle, and a six-foot pole, which was painted blue and white with a hook on one end and a bill on the other. The hook was used to grab fleeing criminals, and the rounded "bill" was used as a weapon. The rattle was a noise-making device used for calling for assistance.

The Day Police, which had no connection to the night watch, was organized in 1838. The Day Police operated under the city marshal and had six appointed officers. This organization would eventually lead to the establishment of the modern-day Boston Police Department.

Nineteenth century 
In 1838, a bill passed in the General Court that allowed the city to appoint police officers, paving the way for the creation of a formal police department. The Boston Police Department was formally founded in May 1854, at which point both the night watch and Day Police were disbanded. A 14-inch club replaced the old hook and bill, which had been in use for 154 years. At the time of its founding, the Boston Police constituted one of the first paid, professional police services in the United States. The department was closely organized and modeled after Sir Robert Peel's (London) Metropolitan Police Service.

On November 3, 1851, the first Irish-born Boston Police officer, Bernard "Barney" McGinniskin, was appointed. His presence generated considerable controversy. The Boston Pilot wrote, "He is the first Irishman that ever carried the stick of a policeman anywhere in this country, and meetings, even Faneuil Hall meetings, have been held to protect against the appointment." At the time, the police salary of $2.00 a day for the morning and afternoon beat and $1.20 for the night watch was nearly twice as high as the wages of laborers. City Marshal Francis Tukey resisted mayor John Prescott Bigelow's appointment of McGinniskin, expressing the predominant anti-Irish sentiments in the city by arguing it was done at "the expense of an American." On January 5, 1852, shortly before the newly elected mayor Benjamin Seaver (who had been supported by Tukey) took office, Tukey fired McGinniskin without giving a reason. After criticism in the press, Seaver reinstated McGinniskin, who remained in the police until the 1854 anti-Irish groundswell of the Know Nothing/American Party movement, when in the words of the Boston Pilot, "Mr. McGinniskin was discharged from the Boston Police for no other reason than he was a Catholic and born in Ireland." McGinniskin became a United States inspector at the customhouse and died of rheumatism on March 2, 1868. McGinniskin is buried in the St. Augustine Cemetery in South Boston.

On October 18, 1857, at about 5:15 a.m., Boston Police Officer Ezekiel W. Hodsdon was patrolling the corner of Havre and Maverick Street in East Boston. Hodsdon attempted to arrest two suspects for a burglary. A struggle ensued, and one of the suspects was able to get behind Hodsdon and shoot him in the head. Hodsdon died about 10:00 A.M., becoming the first Boston police officer killed in the line of duty. He was 25 years old. The murderers fled. Thousands of people visited the station house to view the body. Hodsdon left behind his wife Lydia and infant son Ezekiel, who was born just 13 days prior to his death. He was buried in Woodlawn Cemetery in Everett, according to Boston Globe newspaper reports on October 19, 1857. On October 18, 2007, a memorial was held in honor of Hodsdon on the corner of Havre and Maverick Streets in East Boston. On July 14, 1863, Boston Mayor Frederic W. Lincoln Jr. (1858–1861 & 1863–1867) ordered all 330 officers in the Department to quell a draft riot among Irish Catholics attempting to raid Union armories in the North End.

In 1871, the Boston Police Relief Association was founded. The purpose of the Boston Relief Association is intended to provide support and relief for officers of the Boston Police Department and their families. It was incorporated under the statutes of Massachusetts in 1876. 

The Boston Police Department appointed Horatio J. Homer, its first African American officer, on December 24, 1878. He was promoted to sergeant in 1895. Sgt. Homer retired on Jan 29, 1919, after 40 years of service. He and his wife, Lydia Spriggs Homer, are buried at Evergreen Cemetery in Brighton, MA. On June 26, 2010, the Boston Police Department dedicated a gravestone in honor of Sgt. Homer's service.

20th century

On September 9, 1919, when Police Commissioner Edwin Upton Curtis refused to allow the creation of a police union, 1,117 BPD officers went on strike. This signaled a dramatic shift in traditional labor relations and views on the part of the police, who were unhappy with stagnant wages and poor working conditions. The city soon fell into riots and public chaos as over three-fourths of the department was no longer enforcing public peace. Governor Calvin Coolidge intervened to quash further chaos. Coolidge announced that the police did not have the right to strike against the public safety and brought in the state national guard to restore order to Boston. The strike was broken, permanently, when Coolidge hired replacement police officers, many of whom were returning servicemen from World War I, and the former officers were refused re-entry into the department. Ironically, the new officers hired in the wake of the strike received higher salaries, more vacation days and city-provided uniforms, the very demands the original strikers were requesting. The BPD strike set a precedent for further movements to stymie police unionization around the country.

Coolidge's intervention in the strike brought him national fame, which, in turn, led to his nomination as Harding's running mate for vice-president in the 1920 presidential election.

In 1921, Irene McAuliffe, daughter of the late Weston police chief and horse breeder Patrick McAuliffe, was among the first six female members of the Boston Police Department. An accomplished horsewoman, she was sworn in as a mounted officer of the Weston Police Department in 1913 during the town's bicentennial celebration. She joined the District of Columbia Police Department in 1920, and in 1921 she became a member of the Boston Police Department's Vice Squad.

In 1965, the largest police union representing Boston police employees, the Boston Police Patrolmen's Association, was formed.

School desegregation busing crisis

In 1974 and 1975, the BPD was involved in maintaining order during the public disturbance over court-ordered busing, which was intended to racially desegregate Boston's public school system. The protest of white citizens escalated into street battles in 1974, and in 1975 uniformed BPD officers were stationed inside South Boston High School, Charlestown High School and other Boston public schools.

1982 Boston arson spree

Between 1982 and 1984, an arson ring that included BPD officers and allies set fire to 264 buildings. The ring opposed Proposition 2½, which reduced the funds that Massachusetts municipalities could raise through property taxes and led to cuts in fire departments and police agencies. Through committing arson, the ring hoped to cause social disorder to make the case for the necessity of firefighters and police.

Charles Stuart murder investigation

In 1989, Charles Stuart killed his wife and accused an unknown Black man for the murder. BPD proceeded to conduct a manhunt targeting young Black men, indiscriminately using stop and frisk tactics, especially in neighborhoods of Mission Hill and Roxbury. Some residents compared the response to living in a war zone and the response is said to have contributed to distrust between Black communities and BPD for decades following.

Federal fingerprinting coordination
On August 23, 1995, the BPD became the first police agency to send fingerprint images to the FBI electronically using the newly created EFIPS (now IAFIS) system. The first set of fingerprints were for a suspect arrested for armed robbery. Within hours of the receipt of the fingerprints, the FBI determined that the suspect had a number of prior arrests, including one for assault with intent to kill.

21st century 

On December 31, 2006, 31 Boston Municipal Police Officers were allowed to transfer to the Boston Police. On January 1, 2007, the rest of the Munis were either laid off or transferred to the city's Municipal Protective Services, which provides security to the city's Property Management Department. There was no merger with the Boston Municipal Police.

The transfer of Munis was planned in mid-2006 by Mayor Thomas M. Menino. This plan was met with heavy protest from the Boston Police Patrolmen's Association (BPPA). The BPPA's argument was that the Municipal officers were not qualified to be Boston police officers due to lack of training, political patronage, nepotism, and the fact that the Munis were not civil service tested.

2007 Boston Bomb Scare 

On January 31, 2007, 911 callers mistakenly identified small electronic promotions found throughout Boston and the surrounding cities of Cambridge and Somerville as possible explosives. Upon investigation by Boston Police and other agencies, the suspicious devices turned out to be battery-powered LED placards with an image of a cartoon character called a "mooninite" used in a guerrilla marketing campaign for Aqua Teen Hunger Force Colon Movie Film For Theaters, a film based on the animated television series Aqua Teen Hunger Force on Cartoon Network's late-night programming block Adult Swim.

The BPD's handling of this incident has been criticized by some Boston residents and justified by others: One resident said that the police response was "silly and insane," and that "We’re the laughing stock." Another resident said that the device "looked like a bomb. I picked it up, pulled the tape off it, and there were batteries, two on the top and three on the bottom." The same devices had been distributed in nine other cities across the USA without provoking a similar reaction. The United States Department of Homeland Security praised Boston authorities "for sharing their knowledge quickly with Washington officials and the public."

Occupy Boston Movement 
Beginning in September–October 2011, protesters assembled in Dewey Square as a show of solidarity with the Occupy Wall Street protest in New York. In the early hours of October 11, 2011, Boston Police and Transit Police moved into the protesters' secondary camp, arresting approximately 100 protesters. Protesters reported numerous incidents of  police brutality. Mayor Menino denied the reports and claimed that the protesters endangered public safety.

2020 Black Lives Matter Protests 
During the 2020 George Floyd protests, the department has come under scrutiny by elected officials for its usage of tear gas against civilians. Demonstrations against police brutality began in the city in May 2020 and continued through June.

Overtime fraud cases
In early September 2020, United States Attorney Andrew Lelling indicted nine former and current Boston police officers for allegedly collecting more than $200,000 in fraudulent overtime payments while working in the department’s evidence warehouse.

Alleged child rapist as union president 
In April 2021, The Boston Globe reported that a 1995 internal investigation by the BPD concluded that Patrick M. Rose Sr., a BPD patrolman, had likely sexual assaulted a 12-year-old child. The BPD did not act on that finding. Instead, Rose kept his badge, served for another 21 years, and was elected president of the Boston Police Patrolmen's Association. He was ultimately arrested and on November 20, 2020, Rose was indicted in Suffolk Superior Court on thirty three counts related to sexual assault of children, including sixteen counts of child rape. During his time in the BPD, the department did nothing to limit his interactions with children, including allowing Rose to work on child sexual assault cases.

Commissioner White termination 
Following the abrupt resignation of commissioner William G. Gross at the end of January 2021, mayor Marty Walsh quickly named superintendent Dennis White to succeed Gross. White was sworn in on February 1, 2021. Two days later, White was placed on leave due to "the handling of a 1999 allegation of domestic violence" against White coming to light. The city of Boston subsequently hired an independent attorney to conduct an investigation; meanwhile, Walsh resigned as mayor upon his confirmation as United States Secretary of Labor. Results of the investigation were released in mid-May, followed by several legal actions by White's attorney seeking to block the city from terminating White. Ultimately, acting mayor Kim Janey fired White on June 7, 2021.

Departmental organization

The Boston Police Department has approximately 2,015 officers and 808 civilian personnel, with patrol services covering an area of 89.6 mi2 (232.1 km2) and a population of 617,594. Like all City of Boston departments, the BPD requires all employed officers hired since 1995 to live within Boston city-limits. The BPD is divided into three zones and 11 neighborhood districts spread across the city, with each zone supervised by a Deputy Superintendent and every district headed by a Captain.

Ranks 
The Boston Police rank structure is as follows:

Leadership 

Dennis White was appointed as commissioner on February 1, 2021; he was placed on leave on February 3, 2021.  Gregory P. Long has been the superintendent-in-chief since August 2018; he was named acting commissioner upon White being placed on leave.

Kathleen O'Toole was the first woman to serve as commissioner, from February 2004 through May 2006 when she left to take a new position as Chief Inspector of the Inspectorate of the Irish national police force, the Garda Síochána.

Members of the Boston Police Commission
A three-person police commission (also called the police board) consisted of members nominated by the Governor of Massachusetts and approved by the Massachusetts Governor's Council. The commission was established in 1878 and abolished in 1906.

List of Boston Police Commissioners 
Boston's police commissioner was appointed by the Governor until 1962. Edmund L. McNamara was the first commissioner to be appointed by the Mayor of Boston, taking office in April 1962 via appointment by mayor John F. Collins. Once appointed, a commissioner can only be removed from the position for cause until their term expires. A commissioner may be appointed to a five-year term, or to serve the remainder of a predecessor's five-year term.

Names in italics indicate a person served as acting (interim) commissioner only. Since 1985, several acting commissioners have been sworn as permanent. Numbering is per cited contemporary news reports and may include inconsistencies.

Special operations unit 

The Boston Police Special Operations Unit is a specialized unit within the Boston Police Department responsible for combined duties involving Highway Patrol and traffic enforcement, crowd control, and special weapons and tactics (SWAT) services within the city.

One unique feature of the unit is that the Special Operations Unit primarily relies on the use of Ford Crown Victoria Police Interceptors and Harley-Davidsons in their daily patrols. The use of motorcycles allows the unit to perform routine traffic enforcement; accompany parades, crowds, and visiting dignitaries; and to quickly travel to situations wherein the unit's SWAT skills are requested. Specialized trucks and support vehicles are also used to transport equipment and officers when needed.

The Canine unit with twenty seven patrol/narcotics, and EOD dogs, and Bomb (EOD) squad are also under the Special Operations Division.

Equipment

Transportation 
The Boston Police uses the following vehicles.
 Ford Police Interceptor SUV – Current issue patrol car.
 Chevy Caprice Current issue patrol car.
 Chevy Impala Current issue patrol car.
 Chevy Tahoe PPV – Current issue patrol car.
 Ford Crown Victoria Police Interceptor – Mostly phased out as of July 2019. Occasionally seen on a detail, etc.
 Ford F-250 - Prisoner transport vehicle
 Ford Expedition
 Harley-Davidson
 HMMWV

Weapons 
Boston police officers may carry "only weapons, magazines and ammunition authorized and issued by the Department", which "include, but are not limited to":
 Benelli M3 SBS (12 gauge)
 Bushmaster XM-15 (.223 Remington)
 Glock Model 22 (.40 S&W)
 Glock Model 23 (.40 S&W)
 Glock Model 27 (.40 S&W)
 SIG Sauer GSR in .45 ACP

Demographics 

By gender
 Male: 84%
 Female: 16%

By race
 White: 65.5%
 African-American/Black: 23.9%
 Hispanic: 8.3%
 Asian: 2.4%

Fictional portrayals
The Boston Police Department has been portrayed in several prominent motion pictures including The Equalizer (2014), Patriots Day, Gone Baby Gone, Mystic River, The Departed, Edge of Darkness, Blown Away, The Brink's Job, That's My Boy, R.I.P.D., The Heat, the second "X-Men" film X2 (film), What's The Worst That Could Happen?, The Boondock Saints, Spenser Confidential, Surrogates, and The Town. BPD is also featured in the television series Spenser: For Hire, Rizzoli & Isles, Leverage, Crossing Jordan, Fringe, and the failed Katee Sackhoff/Goran Visnjic police show pilot Boston's Finest.

Fictional BPD districts
Due to filming on location in the Boston area, fake BPD cruisers have been marked with fictional districts to avoid confusion with real BPD cruisers.  They include:
District A-4
 Featured in
 Fringe
District A-8
 Featured in
 That's My Boy outside a housing project
 The Town throughout the film
 R.I.P.D. during the raid where Nick is killed
 Ted 2 seen on the side of a police car
 Patriots Day outside of David Henneberry's house on April 19
District D-6
 Featured in
 The Town outside Fenway Park during the final gunfight scene
District G-4
 Featured in
 Patriots Day
District G-5
 Featured in
 Edge of Darkness outside Craven's house as part of a protection detail
 The Heat Mullins works out of it, but it is somehow part of Area F rather than Area G
District G-8
 Featured in
 Leverage
19th Precinct
 Featured in
 What's the Worst That Could Happen? Detective Tardio claims to be from it when first introducing himself
87th Precinct
 Featured in
 Fuzz

See also
 List of law enforcement agencies in Massachusetts
 Boston Marathon bombing

References

Further reading
 Francis Russell. A City in Terror: Calvin Coolidge and the 1919 Boston Police Strike (Boston: Beacon Press, 1975).

External links 
 Official website
 WokeWindows - Providing a view into the Boston Police Department
 2006 Boston Globe article on the Municipal Police Department/Boston Police Department merger
 The Police News Collection, Scrapbooks, 1961-1968 are located in the Northeastern University Libraries, Archives and Special Collections Department, Boston, MA.
 The Elmer V.H. Brooks papers, 1924-1998 (Bulk 1937-1968) are located in the Northeastern University Libraries, Archives and Special Collections Department, Boston, MA.
 The Justice George Lewis Ruffin Society records, n.d., 1848-1853, 1885-1893, 1963-2005 (bulk 1984-2005) are located in the Northeastern University Libraries, Archives and Special Collections Department, Boston, MA.
 Boston Police Department Annual Reports since 1885 https://web.archive.org/web/20100613003654/http://bpl.org/online/govdocs/bpd_reports.htm

 
Government of Boston
Municipal police departments of Massachusetts
1838 establishments in Massachusetts